Melhus is a municipality in Trøndelag county, Norway.

Melhus may also refer to:

Places
Melhus (village), a village in Melhus, Trøndelag county, Norway
Melhus Church, a church in Melhus, Trøndelag county, Norway
Melhus Station, a railway station in Melhus, Trøndelag county, Norway

Other
Melhus Energi, a defunct power company in Melhus, Trøndelag county, Norway
Melhus IL, a Norwegian sports club from Melhus, Trøndelag county, Norway
Melhus Sparebank, a Norwegian savings bank

People with the surname
Bjørn Melhus, a German artist of Norwegian ancestry

See also
 Mehus (disambiguation)